Doordarshan Kendra, Jalandhar also referred as Jalandhar Doordarshan is an Indian television station in Jalandhar, owned and operated by state-owned Doordarshan, the television network of Prasar Bharati (Broadcasting Corporation of India). It was established in 1979, and now produces and broadcasts the 24-hour Punjabi language TV channel, DD Punjabi, which was launched in 1998 and covers most of the state of Punjab, India.

Early history
Doordarshan Kendra Jalandhar was inaugurated on 13 April 1979, after it was shifted here from Amritsar, where it was first established on 23 September 1973. Its establishment here instead of Amritsar was made possible by the efforts of then Union I & B Minister, I. K. Gujral. The station is located at Gujral Nagar, the center has elaborate programme production facilities and large studios.

The transmission was initially limited to few hours in a day. Besides the regional language Punjabi, some programmes in Hindi and Urdu were also telecast. Even programmes in Haryanvi and Himachali languages were telecast from this Kendra as these states did not at that time have their own Kendras.

With the introduction of Regional Language Satellite Services, all regional centers of Doordarshan started generating programmes in their respective regional languages. And thus, DD Punjabi came into existence along with many other channels of Doordarshan.

DD Punjabi 
Presently, Doordarshan Kendra, Jalandhar telecasts its programmes under the brand name DD Punjabi. DD Punjabi Channel was launched in 1998, and it became a 24-hour service within two years.
In its terrestrial mode DD Punjabi has near 100 per cent reach in the State of Punjab. Besides that, numerous Punjabi viewers residing in different parts of India watch the cultural programmes broadcast on DD Punjabi with interest.

Programmes 
Doordarshan Kendra Jalandhar produces a wide spectrum of programmes including serials, documentaries, musical programmes, reality shows, news and current affairs programmes and utility programmes related to health, agriculture and civic issues, etc.

Doordarshan Kendra Jalandhar has, over the years, produced a number of programmes which not only have been popular among viewers, but have left long lasting impressions.

Serials-Periodicals 
 Supne Te Parchhaven produced and directed by Harjit Singh
 Chitta Lahoo produced and directed by Gulshan Sachdev
 Buniad produced and directed Ravi Deep
 Aag Ka Darya produced by Raj Sharma, directed by DD Kashyap
 Bhai Manna Singh produced by Durgadutt Savitoj, directed by Gursharan Singh
 Lafafi produced and directed by Ravi Deep
 Zindagi produced and directed by Vijay Shair
 Parchhaven produced and directed by Ravi Deep
 Udeekan produced and directed by Vijay Shair
 20 Sawal, quiz programme (Experts: Shivendra Joshi and Anil Chugh; Anchor Prakash Syal) produced by Surinder Sahni
 Parakh; Quiz Master, Surinder Seth
 Ulta Pulta by Jaspal Bhatti
 Chitrahar
 Atro Chatro
 Raunak Mela

TV Shows 
The TV shows like Sandali Paidan, Kach Dian Mundaran, Raunaq Mela, Mela Melian Da and Lashkara, the Quiz programmes: Bees Sawal, Parakh etc., have entertained and educated the viewers over the years, they have also created awareness about richness of Punjabi culture and traditions.

New Year Eve Special Programmes 
Special TV Shows produced by Jalandhar Doordarshan have been extremely popular among viewers due to high quality production and star value.

Artists 
Jalandhar Doordarshan has contributed a lot to make many performing artists stars and these talented artists have on their part played a great role in the success of the channel. Gurdas Mann, Golden Star Malkit Singh, Hans Raj Hans, Sarvjeet Kaur, Noori, Jaspal Bhatti, Savita Bhatti, Vivek Shauk, Satinder Satti, Pramod Moutho, Balwinder Bikki aka Chacha Raunki Ram, Gurpreet Ghuggi, Jatinder Kaur, Neeta Mahindra, Harbhajan Jabbal, Harbhajan Mann, Gursewak Mann, Shivendra Joshi, Anil Chugh, Prakash Syal, Desh Raj Sharma (Chatro), Saroop Singh Parinda (Atro), Surinder Seth, Raman Kumar, Neena Rampal, Arvinder kaur, Jasbir Rishi, Barinder Kaur, Atamjeet Singh. In fact, the list of artists having close and lifelong bonds with Doordarshan is endless.

Awards and nominations
Programmes produced by Jalandhar Kendra have won a number of awards over the years. Jalandhar Kendra won the best Doordarshan Kendra of the Year Trophy at the Second Doordarshan Awards held in 2002.

References 

 Jalandhar Doordarshan

External links
 Doordarshan, Official Internet site
 DD-Punjabi (24hrs)
 http://www.exchange4media.com/news/story.aspx?Section_id=6&News_id=6527

DD Jalandhar
Mass media in Punjab, India
Jalandhar
1979 establishments in Punjab, India
Television stations in India
Earth stations in India
Television channels and stations established in 1979